Vasily Golubev may refer to:

 Vasily Golubev (painter) (1925–1985), Soviet, Russian painter
 Vasily Golubev (politician) (born 1957), governor of Rostov Oblast, Russia